Gracy is a Malayalam author. Her first collection of short stories, Padiyirangippoya Parvati, was published in 1991. Her awards include the Lalithambika Antharjanam Award (1995), the Thoppil Ravi Award (1997), the Katha Prize for the Best Malayalam Short Story (1998) and the Kerala Sahitya Akademi Award (2000). Her major works are Narakavaathil, Randu Swapna Darsikal, Kaveriyude Neru, Eezbu Penkathakal, Panikkannu and a collection, Gracyude Kathakal. Her stories have been translated into English, Hindi, Tamil and Oriya. She was the head of the Malayalam department, Al-Ameen college, Edathala, Aluva.

Her story, ‘Baby Doll’, is  barring the melodramatic laments of a mother who wants to lock her daughter away from reality.

Awards
 1995: Lalithambika Antharjanam Award (1995)
 1997: Thoppil Ravi Award - Bhrantan Pookkal
 1998: Katha Prize for the Best Malayalam Short Story - "Paanchaali"
 2000: Kerala Sahitya Akademi Award (Collection of short stories) - Randu Swapna Darshikal
 2020: Kendra Sahitya Akademi Award for Children's Literature for the book "Vazhthappetta Poocha" (Translation: "Blessed Cat")

Bibliography
 Padiyirangippoya Parvati (1991)
 Narakavaathil
 Randu Swapna Darsikal
 Bhraanthan Pookkal
 Kaveriyude Neru
 Eezhu Penkathakal (Editor)
 Panikkannu
 Gracyude Kathakal
 Moothrathikkara
 Oru Cheriya Jeevithathinte Sirorekhakal (Autobiography)
 Udal vazhikal (stories)
 Apadha Sancharikalkku oru kaipusthakam (memories)
 Vaazhthappetta Poocha (Baalasahithyam)

References

Living people
Malayali people
Indian women short story writers
Malayalam-language writers
Malayalam short story writers
Writers from Kochi
20th-century Indian short story writers
20th-century Indian women writers
Women writers from Kerala
People from Aluva
Year of birth missing (living people)